Fouad Bouguerra (born May 7, 1981) is a footballer. Born in Montélimar in France, he represented Algeria at international level.

Career
He has played for UMS Montélimar, US Millery Vourles and FC Nantes in France, for Tunisian team Club Africain and in the Algerian league for USM Annaba, JSM Bejaïa and MC Oran.

On February 28, 2010, Bouguerra made his league debut for Nyíregyháza Spartacus in a 3–2 win over Vasas SC.

References

1981 births
Living people
French sportspeople of Algerian descent
Algerian footballers
Association football forwards
Algeria international footballers
FC Nantes players
Club Africain players
USM Annaba players
JSM Béjaïa players
MC Oran players
Nyíregyháza Spartacus FC players
Győri ETO FC players
CS Constantine players
Algerian Ligue Professionnelle 1 players
Ligue 1 players
Nemzeti Bajnokság I players
Algerian expatriate footballers
French expatriate footballers
Expatriate footballers in Tunisia
Expatriate footballers in Hungary
Algerian expatriate sportspeople in Tunisia
Algerian expatriate sportspeople in Hungary
French expatriate sportspeople in Tunisia
French expatriate sportspeople in Hungary
People from Montélimar
Sportspeople from Drôme
French footballers
Footballers from Auvergne-Rhône-Alpes